The Meteorite Hills are a group of hills,  long, forming the western portion of the Darwin Mountains in Antarctica. The hills are located between the heads of Darwin Glacier and Hatherton Glacier. The name was proposed by John O. Annexstad of the Meteorite Working Group at the Johnson Space Center, Houston, Texas, in association with field work carried out in this vicinity by the Antarctic Search for Meteorites, led by William A. Cassidy of the University of Pittsburgh, during the 1978–79 season.

References

Further reading 
 Thomas H. Burbine, Asteroids, P 73
 Kevin Righter, Catherine Corrigan, Timothy McCoy, Ralph Harvey, editors, 35 Seasons of U.S. Antarctic Meteorites (1976-2010): A Pictorial Guide To The Collection
 Cari Corrigan, ANTARCTICA: THE BEST PLACE ON EARTH TO COLLECT METEORITES, Smithsonian Institution, OCTOBER 2011, P 296
 Ralph P. Harvey, John Schutt, and Jim Karner, Fieldwork Methods of the U.S. Antarctic Search for Meteorites Program

Hills of Oates Land